The Faulk and Gauntt Building, at 217 N. Prairieville St. in Athens, Texas, was built in 1896.  It was listed on the National Register of Historic Places in 1980.

It is also a Recorded Texas Historic Landmark.

It was deemed significant as "an excellent example of late Victorian commercial architecture. It is one of the few Athens buildings which remains intact from the prosperous railroad era. Furthermore, the history of ownership of the site and structure includes several pioneer families of the community."

References

External links

National Register of Historic Places in Henderson County, Texas
Victorian architecture in Texas
Buildings and structures completed in 1896